New York Department of Transportation may refer to:

New York State Department of Transportation
New York City Department of Transportation